The men's pole vault was one of four men's jumping events on the Athletics at the 1964 Summer Olympics program in Tokyo. Qualification was held on 15 October 1964, with the final on 17 October. 32 athletes from 20 nations entered, with 2 not starting in the qualification round. The final lasted over seven hours, to date the longest competition in history. All finalists qualified at 4.60, however in the final five were unable to achieve the height again.

At the time, the United States had never lost an Olympic pole vault competition. In the final, the last remaining American was Fred Hansen, who at the time was also the world record holder. Hansen cleared 5 meters on his first attempt, but so did three German athletes, making it a four way tie. Hansen passed the next height, watching as only Wolfgang Reinhardt was able to clear. Re-entering the competition at 5.10, Hansen failed his first two attempts, but so did Reinhardt. Hansen then sailed over his final attempt, while Reinhart could not. Hansen continued the American streak, which would survive through one more Olympics until the 1972 pole vault controversy, when defending champion Bob Seagren had his pole confiscated at the games and had to compete on an unfamiliar, borrowed pole. Reinhardt's silver and Klaus Lehnertz's bronze were the first medals by German vaulters.

Background

This was the 15th appearance of the event, which is one of 12 athletics events to have been held at every Summer Olympics. The returning finalists from the 1960 Games were fourth-place finisher Rolando Cruz of Puerto Rico, eighth-place finisher Rudolf Tomášek of Czechoslovakia, and eleventh-place finisher Dimitar Khlebarov of Bulgaria. This was the first Games to feature fiberglass poles, which had been used to break the world record 15 times since 1961. The last six were by three Americans: Brian Sternberg, John Pennel, and Fred Hansen. Sternberg had broken his neck practicing trampolining in 1963 and Pennel had suffered a (far less severe) back injury shortly before the Games, so Hansen was the favorite (though Pennel was able to compete).

For only the second time in Olympic pole vault history (1932), no nations made their debut in the event. The United States made its 15th appearance, the only nation to have competed at every Olympic men's pole vault to that point.

Competition format

The competition used the two-round format introduced in 1912, with results cleared between rounds. Vaulters received three attempts at each height. Ties were broken by the countback rule. At the time, total attempts was used after total misses.

In the qualifying round, the bar was set at 4.20 metres, 4.30 metres, 4.40 metres, 4.55 metres (which every vaulter passed on), and 4.60 metres. All vaulters clearing 4.60 metres advanced to the final. If fewer than 12 cleared that height, the top 12 (including ties) advanced.

In the final, the bar was set at 4.40 metres, 4.60 metres, 4.70 metres, 4.80 metres, and then increased by 5 centimetres as a time.

Records

Prior to this competition, the existing world and Olympic records were as follows.

The qualifying height for the final was only 10 centimetres under the old Olympic record; the introduction of fibreglass poles had made marks set before 1961 trivial for top vaulters. Thirteen men tied the old record, nine broke it, and Fred Hansen finished with a new record fully 40 centimetres above the old one.

Schedule

All times are Japan Standard Time (UTC+9)

Results

Qualifying

Vaulters had to clear 4.60 metres to qualify for the final. The bar started at 4.20 metres, increasing gradually to 4.60 metres. Each jumper had three attempts at each height or could skip any lower height (but could not return to a lower height if he determined that he could not succeed).

Final

References

Athletics at the 1964 Summer Olympics
Pole vault at the Olympics
Men's events at the 1964 Summer Olympics